The 2023–24 Bundesliga will be the 61st season of the Bundesliga, Germany's premier football competition. It will begin on 18 August 2023 and will conclude on 18 May 2024.

Teams

A total of 18 teams will participate in the 2023–24 edition of the Bundesliga. As of 11 March 2023, two teams have confirmed their place in the league.

Stadiums and locations

Personnel and kits

League table

Relegation play-offs
The relegation play-offs will take place on 22 or 23 and 27 or 29 May 2024.

References

External links

Bundesliga seasons
1
Germany
Bundesliga